Ashley Heath Halt was a railway station on the Southampton and Dorchester Railway formerly in the county of Hampshire (now part of Dorset). Opened in 1927, it served the areas of St Leonards and St Ives as well as the village of Ashley Heath itself. This was an emerging residential area, the northern part of what is now the South East Dorset conurbation. The halt consisted of two concrete platforms each with a shelter. There was also a public siding for goods traffic behind the down (south) side platform. The halt was closed during the Beeching Axe, losing its passenger trains in 1964.

History
The Southampton and Dorchester Railway (sponsored by the London and South Western Railway) opened the line here in 1847; it crossed Horton Road at a level crossing, named Woolsbridge Crossing after a hamlet  to the west. At the time, this area was sparsely-populated heathland on the fringe of Ringwood Forest and there was no need for a station.

Spurred by the nearby residential developments of St Leonards, St Ives and Ashley Heath, the Southern Railway (successor to the LSWR) opened an unmanned two-platform halt adjacent to the crossing on 1 April 1927. The halt passed to the Southern Region of British Railways on nationalisation in 1948, and the line and station were then closed to passengers by the British Railways Board on 4 May 1964. Track lifting was completed by 1968.

The station today
The site is now on the Castleman Trailway, off Horton Road, the road from the Ashley Heath interchange to Three Legged Cross. The former line crosses the road next to a shop (formerly the crossing-keeper's house). Short sections of platform including the concrete nameboards remain.

Notes

References

External links
 Ashley Heath station on navigable 1946 O. S. map
Ashley Heath at Subterranea Britannica
Rural Rides

Disused railway stations in Dorset
Former Southern Railway (UK) stations
Railway stations in Great Britain opened in 1927
Railway stations in Great Britain closed in 1964
Beeching closures in England